Mimi and the Biscuit Factory is a 1988 Viveca Sundvall children's book in the Mimmi series. It was published in English in 1989.

Plot
6-year-old Mimmi lives in a yellow house in a small town in Sweden. Hennes mother Elin is a waitress working at restaurant "Gyllene svanen". Sometimes she works during evenings. When Mimmi and her father stand at the balcony they feel the smell from Henry's biscuit factory.

Anders attends the same Kindergarten as Mimmi, and they are both born the same year. A late-May Monday the Kindergarten visits the  biscuit factory. In the morning, Mimmi discovers that one of her teeth has loosened.

At the biscuit factory the children first watch a film about Henry's father, who has developed the biscuits. Henry says the recipe is secret but before his death he will whisper it into his daughter Rosamunda's ear. The children all get a biscuit bag and a bun before walking home. On the way back Mimmi's tand gets stuck in the bun. She puts the bun in her pocket and when she comes home she puts the bun in a glass of water. She has heard it will become one crown. (Swedish currency unit)

Anders and Mimmi then lock themselves up in the kitchen, to develop an own recipe. They hide the recipe behind an old brick wall. 20 years later, they will pick the recipe up.

When Mimmi wakes up the upcoming morning, her tooth in the glass has been replaced to a crown (Swedish currency unit) and the bun is gone. For the crown, she buys a green pear.

References

Mimmi och kexfabriken, Rabén & Sjögren, 1988

1988 children's books
Rabén & Sjögren books
Works by Viveca Lärn